Virtual may refer to:

 Virtual (horse), a thoroughbred racehorse
 Virtual channel, a channel designation which differs from that of the actual radio channel (or range of frequencies) on which the signal travels
 Virtual function, a programming function or method whose behaviour can be overridden within an inheriting class by a function with the same signature
 Virtual machine, the virtualization of a computer system
 Virtual meeting, or web conferencing
 Virtual memory, a memory management technique that abstracts the memory address space in a computer
 Virtual particle, a type of short-lived particle of indeterminate mass
 Virtual reality (virtuality), computer programs with an interface that gives the user the impression that they are physically inside a simulated space
 Virtual world, a computer-based simulated environment populated by many users who can create a personal avatar, and simultaneously and independently explore the world, participate in its activities and communicate with others
 Virtual, a 2001 album by Romanian band Animal X
 Virtual, a former Blizzard Entertainment online streamer known for interviewing Ng Wai Chung during the Blitzchung Controversy
 Exit pupil, a virtual aperture in an optical system

See also 

 Virtual community (disambiguation)
 
 
 List of things described as virtual
 Virtuality (disambiguation)
 Virtualization, a computing technique to create representations of computer resources
 Virtua (disambiguation)